Timothy Joseph Landis (born July 13, 1964) is an American football coach who is currently quarterbacks coach and special teams coordinator at Lycoming College. Previously, Landis was the head coach for the Rensselaer Polytechnic Institute football team. He was also formerly the offensive coordinator for the San Jose State Spartans football team and the head football coach for Bucknell University. He compiled a 23–33 record at Bucknell since 2003 and a 76–85–1 record overall.  Prior to arriving at Bucknell, Landis served as head football coach at Davidson and St. Mary's.

Landis is an alumnus of the Hun School of Princeton and Randolph-Macon College and a former quarterback on the Randolph-Macon football team.  Prior to receiving the head coach positions, Landis served as an assistant at Davidson, as well as a high school coach.

Head coaching record

References

External links
 Lycoming profile
 RPI profile
 Bucknell profile

1964 births
Living people
American football quarterbacks
Bucknell Bison football coaches
Davidson Wildcats football coaches
Lycoming Warriors football coaches
Randolph–Macon Yellow Jackets football coaches
Randolph–Macon Yellow Jackets football players
RPI Engineers football coaches
Saint Mary's Gaels football coaches
San Jose State Spartans football coaches
High school football coaches in Pennsylvania
Hun School of Princeton alumni
People from Yardley, Pennsylvania
Sportspeople from Bucks County, Pennsylvania
Coaches of American football from Pennsylvania
Players of American football from Pennsylvania